Busa was a noble Apulian woman from Canusium who lived during the third century BC. Paulina is sometimes believed to have been her given name and Busa is recorded as her principal family name.

Life 
After the battle of Cannae in 216 BC, when Hannibal obliterated most of the Roman forces, there were about 10,000 men who escaped Hannibal's bloodbath by secretly leaving the area by backroads at night. The fugitives who arrived in Canusium were destitute. They had no food, clothing, medical supplies, or even weapons. According to Livy, the wounded and tired soldiers were first only granted shelter within the city walls, but then Busa came to the rescue and provided these soldiers with corn, clothes, and provisions for their journey. She obtained doctors and medical supplies and took care of the wounded. Her deeds were equated with the generosity of Alexander the Great. For the greatness of her acts, she received public honors from the Roman senate at the end of the war. The possibility of receiving public honors could have also been the motivation for Busa to lend aid to the soldiers.

Valerius Maximus sees her deeds as somewhat less heroic. Although he mentions her in Book VIII of his Memorable Deeds and Sayings (On Liberality), concerning people who show true judgment and honorable benevolence, because she did not impoverish herself by helping the Roman troops she cannot be compared with the likes of (for example) Fabius Maximus, who recovered prisoners from Hannibal but by doing so impoverished himself.

There is to this day a ruined Roman house in the center of Canusium, known to the locals of Canosa today as that belonging to Busa.

References 

3rd-century BC Roman women
Ancient Roman women in warfare
People from Canosa di Puglia